Defence and Citizenship Day (Journée Défense et Citoyenneté) is a day established in 1998 in France by the French president, Jacques Chirac, during his first presidential mandate in the context of the national service reform.

It is a one-day program that deals with citizenship, Duty of Remembrance, and awareness of defence, army, nation and European issues.

It has replaced the military service.

From 1998 to 2010, it was called Defence Preparation Day (Journée d’Appel de Préparation à la Défense).

Participants 
It is compulsory for all persons of French nationality, both males and females, who live in France or abroad, and is directed at young people aged between 16 and 25 years of age.

Exception 
Persons suffering from a serious illness and severely disabled persons are exempted.

Activities 
The program lasts one day, usually from 8:00AM to 5:00PM. Participants first start to fill out some administrative papers and then take some exams to evaluate their French text comprehension. Afterwards, participants learn more about the French defence, the European and international geopolitical situations, and also about international agreements.

It is also an opportunity for participants to discover army trades (such as technician, soldier, mender, pilot, sailor, tank driver etc.), and the different military training programs.

A first aid training has been integrated into the program since 2014.

Certificate 
At the conclusion of the program, an individual certificate is issued to each participant. This certificate is needed to take the baccalaureate examination (except for persons under 18 years of age), to enrol in a public university, to obtain a driving licence or to apply for any civil servant jobs.

Service national universel 
In 2019 the Service national universel (SNU) was introduced by president Emmanuel Macron and will become a compulsory service in 2021. It will last four weeks' time.

See also 
 Civil conscription
 Conscription in France
 Conscription
 Alternative civilian service

References

External links 
 Journée Défense et Citoyenneté, Minister of Defence (France)
 Defence and Citizenship Day 2012, Embassy of France in Dublin
 The "Journée défense et citoyenneté", a day of national defense instruction, Consulate general of France in Miami

 
France